The 2018–19 Cupa României was the 16th season of the annual official Romanian women's football knockout tournament.

Participating clubs
The following 37 teams qualified for the competition:

Round dates

Source:

First round
14 Liga III teams entered the competition for the First Round. The 7 matches in this round were all scheduled and played on  Sunday, 14 October.

Second round
The 7 teams that advanced from the First Round were joined by most of the remaining teams: 14 Liga II teams and 8 Liga I teams, for a total of 29 teams playing 14 matches, while one received a bye. The matches were scheduled to be played on or around 28 October. Two were played in advance, on 25 and 27 October 2019, while two were scheduled on 31 October and two more were postponed for later, on 17 and 18 November. 8 games were played on the original scheduled day of 28 October.

Third Round/ Round of 16

Quarter-finals

Semifinals

Final

References

Romania
Cupa României seasons